Firmin Sanou (born 21 April 1973) is a Burkinabé former professional footballer who played as a defender.

He was part of the Burkinabé 1998 African Nations Cup team, who finished fourth after losing to Congo DR on penalties in the bronze final. He was later part of the 2002 African Nations Cup team, who finished bottom of group B in the first round of competition, thus failing to secure qualification for the quarter-finals.

Career statistics

International goals
Scores and results list Burkina Faso's goal tally first, score column indicates score after each Sanou goal.

References

Living people
1973 births
Association football defenders
Burkinabé footballers
RC Bobo Dioulasso players
Étoile Filante de Ouagadougou players
ASOA Valence players
UMS Montélimar players
1996 African Cup of Nations players
1998 African Cup of Nations players
2002 African Cup of Nations players
Burkinabé expatriate footballers
Burkinabé expatriate sportspeople in France
Expatriate footballers in France
Burkina Faso international footballers
21st-century Burkinabé people
Chambéry SF players